Kappa Cephei, Latinized from κ Cephei, is a binary star system in the northern circumpolar constellation of Cepheus. It is visible to the naked eye as a faint, blue white-hued point of light with an apparent visual magnitude is 4.39. The system is located approximately 323–326 light years distant from the Sun, based on parallax.

The two gravitationally-bound members of this system had an angular separation of  along a position angle of 120°, as of 2015. The primary, designated component A, has a stellar classification of B9III, matching a blue giant. The magnitude 8.34 secondary, component B, is an A-type main-sequence star of class A7V. A third star of 10th magnitude, BD+77 763, is listed as component C in the Washington Double Star Catalog although it is a background object unrelated to the other two.

References

A-type main-sequence stars
B-type giants
Binary stars

Cepheus (constellation)
Cephei, Kappa
Durchmusterung objects
Cephei, 01
192907
099255
7750